Pekka Heino (born 17 July 1961) is a television host and presenter from Turku (Åbo). He is a Sweden Finn. Heino introduces television programmes as a continuity announcer on the Swedish channel SVT, where he has been working on and off since 1985. He has also hosted a number of Swedish television shows, including the popular SVT quiz show Röda tråden, and has commentated on the Eurovision Song Contest several years for Sweden.  During the summer of 2010, Heino hosted the morning show Gomorron Sverige on SVT. It was announced in December 2010 that Heino would host the SVT programme Gokväll together with Inger Ljung.

Heino is openly gay.

References 

Swedish television personalities
Swedish people of Finnish descent
Finnish LGBT entertainers
Swedish LGBT entertainers
Gay entertainers
Finnish LGBT broadcasters
Finnish gay men
Swedish gay men
People from Turku
1961 births
Living people